NMMC may refer to: 

National Maritime Museum Cornwall, England 
Navi Mumbai Municipal Corporation, India 
Navoi Mining & Metallurgy Combinat, Uzbekistan 
Nissan Motor Manufacturing Corporation, a subsidiary of Nissan Motors in Tennessee, United States 
Nork-Marash Medical Center, a teach/research hospital in Armenia